Akagera Aviation School (AAS), is an aviation training school in Rwanda, that provides training for prospective pilots, for both rotary and fixed wing aircraft, serving the Rwanda Defence Force, RwandAir and General Aviation.

Location
The geographical coordinates of the campus of Akagera Aviation School are: 01°57'48.0"S, 30°08'06.5"E (Latitude:-1.963333; Longitude:30.135139).

Overview
The training institution is privately owned by Rwanda Aviation, a company that markets helicopters for sale and/or for hire. The school was established to address the shortage of flight professionals in Rwanda and the region. As of December 2017, RwandAir has 150 pilots, of whom only 25 are Rwandans, and only two are Rwandan captains. The school plans to start training aircraft mechanics and aircraft service crew, at a later date.

Class sizes
The commercial pilot courses for both helicopters and fixed wing aircraft last 18 months. The helicopter pilot class size is about 11 individuals, with intake every June. The fixed wing aircraft pilot class size is 20 students, with intake, every February. The majority of graduates from these classes find employment with RwandaAir and with the Rwanda military.

See also
Transport in Rwanda

References

External links
 Website of Akagera Aviation School
 Akagera Inks Deal With Saudi Firm for Rwanda's First Aviation Academy As of 3 July 2019.

Schools in Kigali
Aviation schools
Aviation schools in Rwanda
Companies of Rwanda
Education companies established in 2013
2013 establishments in Rwanda